Benjamin Tapper is an American social media influencer, conspiracy theorist, and chiropractor, based in Omaha, Nebraska, U.S.

Tapper is one of the "disinformation dozen" responsible for 65% of COVID-19 anti-vaccine misinformation and conspiracy theories on the internet and social media, according to a report by the Center for Countering Digital Hate (CCDH) in 2021.

Tapper's father is a retired chiropractor. Tapper studied at Palmer College of Chiropractic in Davenport, Iowa.

Tapper is a  chiropractor, based in Omaha, Nebraska, U.S. Tapper self-describes as a "Dr", but he is not a medical doctor.

In August 2020, speaking at a Omaha City Council meeting, he said that "masks have absolutely nothing to do with health, but everything to do with compliance with a false tyrannical agenda".

Tapper is married.

References

Living people
American anti-vaccination activists
American conspiracy theorists
American chiropractors
People from Omaha, Nebraska
Year of birth missing (living people)